Sigrid Maria Fredrika Gillner-Ringenson (1891-1975) was a Swedish politician of the Social Democratic Party. 
She was MP of the Second Chamber of the Parliament of Sweden from 1932 to 1936.

References

1891 births
1975 deaths
20th-century Swedish politicians
20th-century Swedish women politicians
Swedish social democrats
Women members of the Riksdag